Pitcairnia amboroensis is a plant species in the genus Pitcairnia. This species is endemic to Bolivia.

References

amboroensis
Flora of Bolivia